Samar Ghaveh (also Romanized as Samar Ghāveh; also known as Samarqāveh, Sāmārgava, Samar Gāveh, and Sāmār Qāvā) is a village in Mian Jam Rural District, in the Central District of Torbat-e Jam County, Razavi Khorasan Province, Iran. At the 2006 census, its population was 146, in 40 families.

References 

Populated places in Torbat-e Jam County